The Special Educational Needs and Disability Act 2001 (c. 10), also known as SENDA, is an Act of the Parliament of the United Kingdom. It is intended as an adjunct to the Disability Discrimination Act 1995, which legislated to prevent the unfair treatment of individuals, in the provision of goods and services, unless justification could be proved. This legislation was deemed necessary as the previous Act did not encompass educational organisations. This was further replaced by the Disability Discrimination Act 2005.

The act required schools, colleges, universities, adult education providers, statutory youth service and local education authorities to make 'reasonable provisions' to ensure people with disabilities or special needs were provided with the same opportunities as those who were not disabled.

The Act stated that discrimination occurred when the educational establishment/body either fails to make reasonable adjustments to accommodate individuals with special needs or a disability, or when they give them less favourable treatment.

See also 
 Special Educational Needs and Disability Tribunal

References

Disability legislation
United Kingdom Acts of Parliament 2001
United Kingdom Education Acts
Anti-discrimination law in the United Kingdom
Disability law in the United Kingdom
Special education in the United Kingdom